Rebollar is a municipality located in the province of Soria, Castile and León, Spain.

References

Municipalities in the Province of Soria